The women's doubles was one of four events of the tennis program at the 2009 Games of the Small States of Europe in Cyprus.

Medalists

Seeds
 Mandy Minella / Claudine Schaul (champions, gold medalists)
 Marina Novak / Kathinka von Deichmann (final, silver medalists)
 Marilena Papadopoulou / Ioanna-Nena Savva (first round)
 Emilia Milovanovic / Louise-Alice Gambarini (semifinals, bronze medalistS)

Draw

References
 Women's Doubles Draw

Women's doubles